The Kiss by the Window (or Kissing by the Window or simply The Kiss) is an 1892 oil-on-canvas painting by the Norwegian artist Edvard Munch, now in the National Gallery of Norway. It forms part of his series known as The Frieze of Life, which treats the cycle of life, death and love and was produced between 1893 and 1918.

References

External links
http://archive.artic.edu/munch/artwork/196574

1892 paintings
Paintings by Edvard Munch
Paintings in the collection of the National Gallery (Norway)